Hopkins is a census-designated place (CDP) in Richland County, South Carolina, United States, that was founded circa 1836 and named after John Hopkins(1739-1775). As of the 2010 census, the population of the Hopkins CDP was 2,882.

Demographics

2020 census

As of the 2020 United States census, there were 2,514 people, 1,016 households, and 660 families residing in the CDP.

Attractions
The Congaree National Park has contiguously preserved the largest tract of old-growth bottomland hardwood forest in the United States, and contains one of the tallest deciduous forests in the world. It has  of land and water. The park was designated an international Biosphere, a Globally Important Bird Area, and a National Natural Landmark. While in the park one can hike, backpack, camp, canoe, fish, birdwatch, and study nature.

The city is also home to the Columbia South Carolina Temple of the Church of Jesus Christ of Latter-day Saints.

Education
Richland County School District One operates public schools serving Hopkins. Residents are zoned to Hopkins Elementary School, Horrell Hill Elementary School, Hopkins Middle School, Southeast Middle School, and Lower Richland High School.

Notable people
Joseph Neal, South Carolina state legislator, was born in Hopkins.
A'ja Wilson, basketball player for 2017 NCAA champion South Carolina, was born in Hopkins.
Derwin Montgomery, North Carolina state legislator, grew up in Hopkins and was elected to the Winston-Salem City Council in 2009. He was appointed in 2018 to a seat in the N.C. House.
Teyonah Parris, Emmy-nominated actress, grew up in Hopkins. She appeared in Mad Men, Survivor's Remorse, Empire, and was the lead character in Spike Lee's film Chi-raq. Currently stars in Disney+'s WandaVision
David Patten, former NFL wide receiver who won three Super Bowls with the New England Patriots
King George, Music Artist

References

External links
 Hopkins, SC,  at ePodunk  
 Congaree National Park

Census-designated places in South Carolina
Census-designated places in Richland County, South Carolina
Columbia metropolitan area (South Carolina)